William Francis Ludolph (January 21, 1900 – April 8, 1952), nicknamed "Wee Willie", was a professional baseball player.  He was a right-handed pitcher for one season (1924) with the Detroit Tigers.  For his career, he recorded no decisions with a 4.76 earned run average, and 1 strikeout in  innings pitched.

An alumnus of St. Mary's College of California, he was born in San Francisco, California and died in Oakland, California at the age of 52.

External links

 Willie Ludolph at SABR (Baseball BioProject)

1900 births
1952 deaths
Detroit Tigers players
Major League Baseball pitchers
Baseball players from California
Des Moines Boosters players
San Francisco Seals (baseball) players
Bay City Wolves players
Vernon Tigers players
Mission Bells players
Little Rock Travelers players
Mission Reds players
Birmingham Barons players
Oakland Oaks (baseball) players
Saint Mary's Gaels baseball players
Pacific Coast League MVP award winners